The 2014–15 New Hampshire Wildcats men's basketball team  represented the University of New Hampshire during the 2014–15 NCAA Division I men's basketball season. The Wildcats, led by tenth year head coach Bill Herrion, played their home games at Lundholm Gym and were members of the America East Conference. They finished the season 19–13, 11–5 in America East play to finish in fourth place. They advanced to the semifinals of the America East tournament where they lost to Albany. They were invited to the CollegeInsider.com Postseason Tournament (CIT) where they lost in the first round to NJIT.

Roster

Schedule

|-
!colspan=9 style="background:#191970; color:#FFFFFF;"| Regular season

|-
!colspan=9 style="background:#191970; color:#FFFFFF;"| America East tournament

|-
!colspan=9 style="background:#191970; color:#FFFFFF;"| CIT

References

New Hampshire
New Hampshire Wildcats men's basketball seasons
New Hampshire
New Hampshire Wildcats men's basketball
New Hampshire Wildcats men's basketball